Southern Arkansas University (SAU) is a public university in Magnolia, Arkansas.

History

Southern Arkansas University was established by an Act of the Arkansas Legislature in 1909 as a district agricultural high school for southwest Arkansas and was originally named Third District Agricultural School, often called by students and faculty "TDAS."  Its first term began in January 1911, with its curriculum including only subjects at the secondary school level.  In 1925, the State Legislature authorized the school to add two years of college work and to change its name to Agricultural and Mechanical College, Third District (Magnolia A&M).  The school continued to offer both high school and junior college courses until 1937, at which time the high school courses were discontinued.

In the fall of 1949, the Board of Trustees, exercising authority vested in it by the State Legislature, decided to develop the college as a four-year, degree-granting institution. The Board authorized the addition of third-year college level courses to being with the fall semester of 1950. Fourth-year courses were added in the fall semester of 1951.  By Act Eleven (January 24, 1951), the State Legislature changed the name of the institution to Southern State College.  In 1975, the institution was approved and accredited to offer a Master of Education Degree in selected areas.  Following approval of the Board of Trustees, the name of the institution was changed to Southern Arkansas University by the Board of Higher Education on July 9, 1976, in accordance with Act 343 of the General Assembly of 1975.

Also in 1975, Southwest Technical Institute in Camden, Arkansas, joined the SAU system as Southern Arkansas University Tech.

Academics
Southern Arkansas University offers 70 different undergraduate options, including pre-professional tracks, and 2+2 degree completion programs in four different academic colleges:

 David F. Rankin College of Business
 College of Education and Human Performance
 Dempsey College of Liberal and Performing Arts
 College of Science and Engineering

Southern Arkansas University also offers 19 graduate programs, which are offered either face-to-face, online, or as a hybrid combination of the two.

Campus housing

Residence halls
The university operates several residence halls, many of which are associated with specific living-learning communities (LLCs):

 Arkansas Hall (Leadership College)
 Bussey Hall (Females Only)
 Burns-Harsh Hall (Freshmen Only)
 Columbia Hall (Residential College)
 Fincher Hall (Band Members Only)
 Greene Hall
 Harrod Hall
 Honors Hall (North and South)
 Magnolia Hall
 Talbot Hall (Males Only)
 Talley Hall
 University Hall Learning Community

Apartments
 Mulerider Pointe Apartments (purchased by SAU in 2018)
 University Village (two-bedroom and four-bedroom apartments)

Athletics

Southern Arkansas University is in the NCAA Division II as a member of the Great American Conference.

The university's athletic nicknames are Muleriders and Lady Muleriders.

The Muleriders football team won the Gulf South Conference Championship in 1997.

In each of 1953 and 1954, the then Southern State College Mulerider tennis team went undefeated winning the Arkansas Intercollegiate Conference in both singles and doubles and was invited by the National Association of Intercollegiate Athletics to represent their district in their National Tennis Championships in 1953.

In 2006 and 2009, the Mulerider baseball team won the Gulf South Conference championship. In 2009 the Mulerider baseball team hosted the NCAA Division II South Regional for the first time in school history.

In 2007, the Mulerider coed cheerleading squad competed at the NCA National Competition. In 2008, the cheerleading squad went back to nationals and took 5th in their division.

Traditions

Bed races
The annual Bed Races have been a unique tradition as a part of SAU's Family Day festivities since November 7, 1981. Representatives from SAU's residence halls build and race twin-sized "beds" with a mattress platform on top of four bicycle tires. Once constructed, the beds are decorated according to a theme decided annually by the residence's Hall Councils. The bed must have one reclining student, protected by a football helmet, and four runners. Each team competes in a double elimination race, and the winners take home the coveted Bed Race Trophy.

Celebration of Lights
The Celebration of Lights has been a Christmas tradition at SAU since 1984. What once started as a single display to celebrate the 75th anniversary of the school has become an annual part of the holidays in Magnolia. During the celebration, a large Christmas tree is lit in front of Overstreet, as well as light displays all over campus. Additional strands of lights are strewn along the 187-foot SAU bell tower, transforming it into a giant Christmas candle. Included in the festivities each year are: the Magnolia City Christmas Parade, caroling, pictures with Santa Claus for the children, and a holiday buffet dinner for the community.

Greek life

Sororities

National Panhellenic Conference affiliates
 Alpha Sigma Alpha (Epsilon Alpha chapter)
 Phi Mu (Epsilon Omicron chapter)
 Sigma Sigma Sigma (Epsilon Zeta chapter)
 Sigma Alpha (Beta Rho chapter)

National Pan-Hellenic Council affiliates
 Alpha Kappa Alpha (Iota Zeta chapter)
 Delta Sigma Theta (Lambda Mu chapter)
 Sigma Gamma Rho (Mu Eta chapter)
 Zeta Phi Beta (Iota Xi chapter)

Other
 Sigma Phi Lambda (Alpha Iota chapter)

Fraternities

North-American Interfraternity Conference affiliates
 Alpha Gamma Rho (Gamma Gamma chapter)
 Sigma Pi (Epsilon Kappa chapter)
 Phi Lambda Chi (Nu chapter)

National Pan-Hellenic Council affiliates
 Alpha Phi Alpha (Kappa Iota chapter)
 Kappa Alpha Psi (Lambda Kappa chapter)
 Omega Psi Phi (Delta Eta chapter)
 Phi Beta Sigma (Theta Nu chapter)
 Iota Phi Theta (Theta Upsilon chapter)

Band
 Kappa Kappa Psi (Delta Chi chapter)
 Tau Beta Sigma (Gamma Omicron chapter)

Music
 Phi Mu Alpha (Eta Gamma Chapter)

Notable alumni
 Jordan Babineaux – NFL football player for the Seattle Seahawks
 Ken Beck – defensive tackle for the Green Bay Packers in 1959 and 1960 seasons; later, educator and coach in Cotton Valley, Louisiana
 Bruce Bennett – Arkansas attorney general (1957–1960 and 1963–1966)
 Kristi Bennett – Police Chief, Texarkana, Arkansas.
 Ken Brown – former NFL player
 Joyce Elliott – Democratic member of the Arkansas Senate since 2009
 Steve Forbes – Head basketball coach for the Wake Forest men's basketball team
 Tanner Hudson – former NFL player. He transferred after his sophomore season
 Dan Kyle –  Louisiana politician
 Tracy Lawrence – Award-winning country music performer
 Nik Lewis – CFL All-Star football player for the Montréal Alouettes
 Lynn Lowe – Republican state party chairman, 1974–1980; Republican gubernatorial nominee, 1978
 Fred Perry – CFL All-Star football player for Edmonton Eskimos
 Kenneth Pettway – former NFL player. He transferred after his sophomore season
 Ron Simmons – Member of the Texas House of Representatives from Carrollton since 2013; reared in southern Arkansas, attended SAU, and transferred to Dallas Baptist University, from which he received a Bachelor of Business Administration degree
 Frank Spooner – Louisiana businessman and politician; attended first two years of college at SAU in the 1950s
 Harry Thomason – film & television producer/director of TV series: "Fall Guy","Designing Women"
 Cedric Thornton – NFL football player for the Dallas Cowboys
 Tommy Tuberville – Current United States Junior Senator for Alabama; Former head football coach at University of Cincinnati, Texas Tech University, Auburn University, & Ole Miss
 DeAnn Vaught – farmer in Sevier County and a Republican member of the Arkansas House of Representatives since 2015
 Horace M. Wade – General in the United States Air Force
 Dennis Woodberry – former NFL player

Notable faculty
 Robert Kibbee (died 1982), Chancellor of the City University of New York

Gallery

References

External links
 
 Southern Arkansas Athletics website

 
Public universities and colleges in Arkansas
Buildings and structures in Columbia County, Arkansas
Education in Columbia County, Arkansas
1909 establishments in Arkansas
Educational institutions established in 1909
Magnolia, Arkansas